Tibor Csík 2 September, 1927- was a bantamweight professional boxer from Hungary, who won the gold medal at the 1948 Summer Olympics.

He was born in Jászberény into a poor family. He began boxing in featherweight and later changed to bantamweight. A two-time Hungarian champion from 1946 and 1948, his biggest success was the Olympic Games gold medal he won in London.

Csik had an easy route to the semi-finals, as his first opponent was disqualified, and his quarter final opponent Jimmy Carruthers of Australia, was forced to withdraw due to an eye injury. In the final, Csik won a decision over Giovanni Zuddas of Italy, to win the gold medal. After his return to Hungary he was awarded the honorary citizenship of Jászberény.

He actively participated in the Hungarian Revolution of 1956, which eventually was struck down by the invading Soviet Army and Csík had to flee Hungary. He settled in Australia, where he died in 1976. He was buried in Sydney.

1948 Olympic results

Below is the record of Tibor Csik who competed as a bantamweight at the 1948 Olympic boxing tournament in London:

 Round of 32: defeated Manoel do Nacsimento (Brazil) by disqualification in round 2
 Round of 16: defeated Santiago Rivera (Peru) on points
 Quarterfinal: defeated Jimmy Carruthers (Australia) by walkover
 Semifinal: defeated Juan Evangelista Venegas (Puerto Rico) on points
 Final: defeated Giovanni Zuddas (Italy) on points (won gold medal)

References

1927 births
1976 deaths
People from Jászberény
Bantamweight boxers
Olympic boxers of Hungary
Olympic gold medalists for Hungary
Boxers at the 1948 Summer Olympics
Olympic medalists in boxing
Medalists at the 1948 Summer Olympics
Hungarian emigrants to Australia
Hungarian male boxers
Sportspeople from Jász-Nagykun-Szolnok County
20th-century Hungarian people